Tobi Merritt Edwards Young is a Native American lawyer. An enrolled citizen of the Chickasaw Nation, Young is believed to be the first member of a Native American tribe to serve as a law clerk of the Supreme Court of the United States.

Early life and education 
A native of Midwest City, Oklahoma, Young is the daughter of Nancy Edwards and Rick Merritt. She graduated from Dartmouth College and George Washington University. In 2003, she received a JD degree from the University of Mississippi School of Law. Prior to attending law school, she was press secretary for U.S. Representative J. C. Watts.

Career 
After graduation, Young worked as a lawyer with the Civil Rights Division of the U.S. Department of Justice from 2003 to 2006. She worked on school desegregation issues, voter rights such as ensuring Choctaw tribe members received voting instructions in their native language, and was a delegate to Human Rights conventions on torture in Geneva, Switzerland. She then clerked for Judge Jerome A. Holmes of the United States Court of Appeals for the Tenth Circuit. She worked as associate counsel for President George W. Bush in the Office of the White House Counsel from 2007 to 2008, and was general counsel and board secretary for the George W. Bush Presidential Center from 2009 to 2018.

In 2018–19, Young served as a law clerk for Justice Neil Gorsuch of the Supreme Court of the United States. She is believed to be the first Native American tribal member to serve in that position. She first met Gorsuch when they were both working at the Justice Department. In September 2019, Young helped lead a public conversation with Justice Gorsuch at Pepperdine University School of Law.

Currently, she is a vice president of legal and government affairs at Cognizant. She has taught law as an adjunct professor at Ole Miss.

Personal life

She is married to Evan A. Young, an associate justice on the Supreme Court of Texas since 2021. He is a former law clerk for Justice Antonin Scalia.

References

Selected publications
 

Living people
Year of birth missing (living people)
Law clerks of the Supreme Court of the United States
Dartmouth College alumni
George Washington University alumni
University of Mississippi School of Law alumni
21st-century American lawyers
Oklahoma lawyers
George W. Bush administration personnel
21st-century American women lawyers